Zhang Xiaoyi (born 25 May 1989) is a Chinese long jumper. In April 2006 he jumped 8.17 metres in Chongqing, a new Chinese junior record. At the 2006 World Junior Championships held in his home country he won the bronze medal with a 7.86 metres jump. Towards the end of the season he finished fourth at the Asian Games, this time with 7.78 metres.

In June 2007 he confirmed his form with an 8.09 m jump in Suzhou.

Achievements

References

1989 births
Living people
Chinese male long jumpers
Olympic athletes of China
Athletes (track and field) at the 2012 Summer Olympics
Athletes (track and field) at the 2006 Asian Games
People from Taicang
Athletes from Jiangsu
Asian Games competitors for China
21st-century Chinese people